Currents in Theology and Mission is a quarterly peer-reviewed open access academic journal of theology published by the Lutheran School of Theology at Chicago and Wartburg Theological Seminary. The editors-in-chief are Kathleen D. Billman and Craig Nessan. The journal was established in 1974 as a publication of Seminex, as a continuation of the defunct Concordia Theological Monthly.

Abstracting and indexing
The journal is abstracted and indexed in the ATLA Religion Database.

References

External links
 

Protestant studies journals
English-language journals
Quarterly journals
Publications established in 1974
Lutheran School of Theology at Chicago